Cergy-Préfecture is a railway station in Cergy, France.

The station is underground and has two platforms. The entire area above and around the station is built up and the département council has its offices next to the station (hence the station's name). The station is at the heart of a transport interchange at level -1 with the bus station at ground level. Level 1 is a large concrete slab plaza with shops and living apartments.

Cergy–Préfecture only has two platforms, with the platform situated between both tracks. Walls at platform level were painted with graffiti with messages of peace to discourage vandals. The general ambiance of the station is rather dark, but secure but CCTV monitoring the interchange.

Rail services link Cergy to Cergy-le-Haut and the Western Paris suburbs. Buses serve the ville nouvelle and particularly Pontoise and the rest of Val-d'Oise département.

See also

 List of stations of the Paris RER

External links
 
 
Agence des gares

Réseau Express Régional stations
Cergy - Prefecture
Railway stations in Val-d'Oise